Ethan Orr (born in Tucson, Arizona) is an American politician and a former Republican member of the Arizona House of Representatives. He represented District 9 from 2013 through 2015.

Education
Orr earned his MPA from the University of Arizona.

Elections
 2012 With incumbent Republican Representatives Rick Gray and Debbie Lesko redistricted to District 21, Orr ran in the August 28, 2012 Republican Primary with a write-in candidate; Orr place first with 15,879 votes, and won the second seat in the November 6, 2012 General election with 42,626 votes above Democratic nominee Mohur Sidhwa, who had sought the District 28 seat in 2010.

Orr lost reelection to Randy Friese in the 2014 elections.

References

External links
 Official page at the Arizona State Legislature
 Campaign site
 

Year of birth missing (living people)
Living people
Republican Party members of the Arizona House of Representatives
Politicians from Tucson, Arizona
University of Arizona alumni
21st-century American politicians